The Corsicana Oilers was the primary moniker of the minor league baseball teams based in Corsicana, Texas between 1902 and 1928.  Corsicana teams played as members of the Texas League (1902–1905), North Texas League (1907), Central Texas League (1914–1915, 1917), Texas-Oklahoma League (1922), Texas Association (1923–1926) and Lone Star League (1927–1928), winning five league championships. Corsicana hosted minor league home games at Oil City Park and Athletic Park.

The 1922 Corsicana Gumbo Busters played as a minor league affiliate of the St. Louis Cardinals.

The 1902 Corsicana Oil Citys team is ranked in The National Baseball Association's top 100 minor league teams list as one of the top all–time minor league teams.

History
Minor league baseball began in Corsicana with the 1902 Corsicana Oil Citys of the Class D level Texas League. The Oil Citys won the league championship in dominant fashion, as the team ended the 1902 season with a record of 87–23, placing 1st in the Texas League under manager Mike O'Connor. On Sunday, June 15, 1902, Corsicana defeated the Texarkana Casketmakers by a score of 51–3 as  J.J. Clarke reportedly hit 8 home runs in the contest. In winning both halves of the season standings, the Oil Citys' season included a 27–game winning streak. The 1902 team is listed at #51 on The National Baseball Association's top 100 minor league teams of all time.

In their second season, the 1903 Corsicana Oil Citys placed 4th in the Texas League final standings. Corsicana had an overall record of 54–54 under manager Mike O'Connor.

The Corsicana Oil City Oil Citys won the Texas League championship. The Oil Citys ended the 1904 season with a record of 48–53, placing 3rd in the Texas League regular seasons. Curley Maloney and Walter Salm served as managers as the Oil Citys went on to win the 1904 championship. In the extended playoffs, Corsicana defeated the Fort Worth Panthers 11 games to 8.

The Corsicana Oilers began the season playing in the Texas League. However, on June 1, 1905, the Oilers had a record of 10–30 when Corsicana surrendered its franchise and was dropped from the league on June 6, 1905. The managers were Walter Salm, Con Lucid and Lou Mahaffey

The Corsicana Desperados returned minor league baseball when the team became members of the 1907 Class D level North Texas League. The Desperados had a 38–21 record and were in 1st place when the, four–team league folded on June 30, 1907. Dee Poindexter served as manager, as Corsicana finished 2.0 games ahead of the 2nd place Paris Athletics.

In 1914, the Corsicana Athletics became charter members of the Central Texas League, which was formed as a six–team Class D level league. The Athletics ended the 1914 Central Texas League regular season with a record of 26–32, placing 5th in the standings under manager Neal Kennedy.

Continuing play in 1915, Corsicana placed 2nd in the Central Texas League standings. The Athletics or A's for short, ended the 1915 season with a 32–29 record, finishing 3.0 games behind the 1st place Ennis Tigers. On May 27, 1915, Erwin of Corsicana threw a no-hitter against the Kaufman Kings as the Athletics won 2–0. On June 19, 1915, Corsicana pitcher Joe Page threw the second no-hitter of the season against the Ennis Tigers in a 2–1 victory. Roy Morton was the 1915 manager. The Corsicana franchise folded after the 1915 season.

The Corsicana Athletics briefly returned to play in the 1917 the Central Texas League. With a 4–4 record, the Temple Governors franchise moved to Corsicana June 1, 1917. Shortly after, the team had an overall record of 6–8 under manager Paul Trammel when the Central Texas League permanently folded on June 6, 1917.

The 1922 Corsicana Gumbo Busters returned the city to minor league play and were an affiliate of the St. Louis Cardinals. Playing as members of the Class D level Texas-Oklahoma League, the Gumbo Busters finished the 1922 regular season with a 56–46 record, placing 3rd in the league standings, 13.0 games behind the Paris Snappers in the final league standings. Chuck Miller and Harvey Grubb served as managers.

The Corsicana "Oilers" moniker returned as the franchise joined the Class D level 1923 Texas Association. The Oilers finished 1923 with a record of 68–70, placing 4th in the six–team Texas Association, 11.0 games behind the 1st place Mexia Gushers under manager Harvey Grubb.

The 1924 Corsicana Oilers won the Texas Association Championship. The Oilers ended the 1924 season with a record of 83–42, placing 1st in the Texas Association standings under manager John Vann. The Oilers were 11.5 games ahead of the 2nd place Marlin Bathers in the six–team standings.

The Corsicana Oilers won a second consecutive Texas Association Championship in 1925. Again under manager John Vann, the Oilers finished the 1925 season with a record of 85–48, finishing 1st in the Texas Association standings, 9.0 games ahead of the 2nd place Mexia Gushers.

The 1926 Corsicana Oilers finished last in the Texas Association. With a record of 53–72, Corsicana finished 6th in the Texas Association under manager John Vann. The Oilers were 21.5 games behind the 1st place Austin Senators. The Texas Association folded after the 1926 season.

The Corsicana Oilers became charter members of the 1927 Lone Star League, an eight–team Class D league. The Oilers ended the 1927 season with a record of 48–72, placing 6th in the final standings under managers Les Nunamaker and Ben Brownlow. Corsicana finished 21.0 games behind the 1st place Palestine Pals.

In their final season of play, the 1928 Corsicana Oilers finished 5th in the Lone Star League. Corsicana ended their final season with a record of 55–68 under manager Ray Falk. The Corsicana franchise permanently folded after the 1928 season.

Corsicana has not hosted another minor league baseball team.

The ballparks
Corsicana teams were noted to have played home games at Oil City Park in the seasons from 1902 to 1907.

Beginning in 1914, Corsicana teams played at Athletic Park. The ballpark was located between South Seaton & South 9th Streets and between East 10th Avenue & East 11th Avenue.

Timeline

Year–by–year records

No-hitters

Notable alumni

Walter Blair (1903)
Neal Baker (1928)
Bruno Block (1905)
Jim Brown (1924)
Nig Clarke (1902)
Tex Covington (1907)
Wally Dashiell (1926)
George Edmondson (1922)
Tim Griesenbeck (1926)
Harvey Grubb (1922–1925; 1923, MGR)
 Hunter Hill (1902–1903)
Jimmie Humphries (1907)
Cobe Jones (1926)
Jack Knott (1926–1927)
Tom Lovelace (1924–1927)
Con Lucid (1903, 1905, MGR)
Tex McDonald (1927)
Slim McGrew (1926)
Otto McIvor (1905)
Chuck Miller (1922, MGR)
Walter Morris (1902)
Les Nunamaker (1927, MGR)
Tony Piet (1928)
Bill Shores (1926)
Oscar Siemer (1923)
John Vann (1924–1926, MGR)
Hippo Vaughn (1907) ERA Title
Lucky Wright (1902)

See also
Corsicana Oilers playersCorsicana Oil Citys players

References

External links
Baseball Reference

Defunct minor league baseball teams
Professional baseball teams in Texas
Defunct baseball teams in Texas
Baseball teams established in 1902
Baseball teams disestablished in 1928
Corsicana, Texas
Navarro County, Texas
Defunct Texas League teams
1902 establishments in Texas
1928 disestablishments in Texas